Let Us Never Speak of It Again is the second and final studio album by American electronic band Out Hud, released in 2005.

Unlike the band's debut, which was an almost completely instrumental affair, Let Us Never Speak of It Again shifts more towards tech house/dance-pop, adding vocals by drummer Phyllis Forbes and cellist Molly Schnick. While received fairly favorably, some reviewers lamented the shift, calling it a step back from their debut. Their song "How Long" appeared in the 2007 movie I Know Who Killed Me, starring Lindsay Lohan.

Track listing

References

2005 albums
Out Hud albums
Kranky albums